Calvesi is a surname. Notable people with the surname include:

Maurizio Calvesi (born 1954), Italian cinematographer
Sandro Calvesi (1913–1980), Italian athletics coach
Vincenzo Calvesi (fl. 1777–1811), Italian operatic tenor and impresario

Italian-language surnames